Martin Vosseler (October 4, 1948 – October 23, 2019) was a Swiss renewable energy advocate, co-founder of the organization Physicians for Social Responsibility, who has been a renewable energy advocate since 1981. After giving up his medical practice in 1995, he began working full-time to raise awareness of the benefits of renewable energy use, by traveling around the world. From 16 October 2006 to 8 May 2007 Vosseler and his crew made history by completing the first trans-Atlantic crossing in a motorized boat, using solar power only.  Vosseler received a special prize from Eurosolar.

Vosseler died on 23 October 2019 after he was struck by a truck while bicycling in Basel. He was 71 years old.

References

External links

Memorial website Martin Vosseler – 4.10.1948 – 23.10.2019

People associated with renewable energy
Swiss environmentalists
1948 births
2019 deaths
Road incident deaths in Switzerland